The Saturn Awards have various Best Film categories. Saturn Award for Best Film may refer to:

 Saturn Award for Best Science Fiction Film (since 1972)
 Saturn Award for Best Horror Film (since 1972), known as Best Horror or Thriller Film from 2010 to 2012
 Saturn Award for Best Fantasy Film (since 1973)
 Saturn Award for Best Animated Film (1978, 1982, 2002–present)
 Saturn Award for Best Foreign Film (1979 only)
 Saturn Award for Best Low-Budget Film (1980–1982)
 Saturn Award for Best International Film (1980, 2006–present)
 Saturn Award for Best Action or Adventure Film (since 1994), originally Best Action/Adventure/Thriller Film from 1994 to 2010)
 Saturn Award for Best Thriller Film (since 2010), originally Best Horror or Thriller Film from 2010 to 2012
 Saturn Award for Best Independent Film (since 2012)
 Saturn Award for Best Comic-to-Film Motion Picture (since 2013)